The Chattanooga Public Library (est. 1905) of Chattanooga, Tennessee, is a municipal public library overseen by the city government. As of 1928 it ran the Hamilton County public library. In 2013 it opened a makerspace. The current building on Broad Street used to show signage as the Chattanooga-Hamilton County Bicentennial Library, having opened in 1976.

A former building of the library system was listed on the National Register of Historic Places as Old Library Building.  It was a Carnegie library built in 1904. That building was superseded by one on the corner of McCallie Avenue and Douglas Street, in use until 1976, now Fletcher Hall, housing the Gary W. Rollins College of Business, a part of the University of Tennessee at Chattanooga.

List of databases
As of 2014 the library arranges for its patrons access to digital content from several providers:

References

Further reading

External links
 Official website
 Flickr. Chattanooga Public Library photos

Public libraries in Tennessee
Organizations based in Chattanooga, Tennessee
1905 establishments in Tennessee
Hackerspaces